Ivan Dodig and Édouard Roger-Vasselin were the defending champions from when the tournament was last held in 2019, but Dodig decided not to participate this year. Roger-Vasselin played alongside Henri Kontinen but lost in the quarterfinals to Matthew Ebden and John-Patrick Smith.

Hugo Nys and Tim Pütz won the title, defeating Pierre-Hugues Herbert and Nicolas Mahut in the final, 6–4, 5–7, [10–8].

Seeds

Draw

Draw

References

External Links
 Main Draw

ATP Lyon Open - Doubles
2021 Doubles
ATP Lyon Open